Aphorista is a genus of handsome fungus beetles in the family Endomychidae. There are at least four described species in Aphorista.

Species
These four species belong to the genus Aphorista:
 Aphorista laeta (LeConte, 1854)
 Aphorista morosa (LeConte, 1859)
 Aphorista ovipennis Casey
 Aphorista vittata (Fabricius, 1787)

References

Further reading

 
 
 

Endomychidae
Articles created by Qbugbot
Coccinelloidea genera